Anna Magdalena Stecksén (May 27, 1870 – October 15, 1904) was a Swedish scientist, physician and pathologist. She was the first female Doctor of Medicine in Sweden.  

Born in Stockholm, Anna Stecksén was the daughter of general major Johan Olof Billdau Stecksén, who encouraged her to pursue advanced education.  She was awarded a Bachelor of Arts at Uppsala University in 1890, and became a student at Karolinska institutet the same year.  She pursued her studies  at Tübingen and Paris 1898–99. At a time when most women who studied medicine specialized in gynecology, she specialized in pathology  

She became the first Swedish woman to defend a thesis in medicine.  She was awarded the Doctor of Medicine in 1900.  Her thesis, Studie öfver Curtis blastomyocel - från svulst - etiologisk synpunk investigated whether there was any truth in the then-popular theory that cancer was caused by Saccharomyces cerevisiae. Her research was not conclusive, but interesting enough for her to raise the funds to continue her research. She was only the second women to publish in the Swedish medical journal Hygiea. However, she contracted an infection caused by her work in her laboratory in 1902  which eventually led to her death in 1904, in Södertälje. She was buried at Norra cemetery in Solna.

References

1870 births
1904 deaths
Swedish women physicians
Swedish pathologists
Women pathologists
Swedish women scientists
Uppsala University alumni
19th-century Swedish physicians
20th-century Swedish physicians
19th-century women scientists
20th-century women scientists
Swedish women academics
19th-century Swedish scientists
20th-century women physicians
19th-century women physicians
20th-century Swedish women
Karolinska Institute alumni